Horodok Raion can refer to:
 Horodok Raion, Khmelnytskyi Oblast, Ukraine
 Horodok Raion, Lviv Oblast, Ukraine
 Haradok Raion, Vitebsk Oblast, Belarus